National Ear Care Centre is a federal government of Nigeria speciality hospital located in Kaduna, Kaduna State, Nigeria. The current chief medical director is Mustapha Abubakar-Yaro.


History 
National Ear Care Centre was established in 1999.

CMD 
The current chief medical director is Mustapha Abubakar-Yaro.

References 

Hospitals in Nigeria